Ilisha may refer to:

 Ilisha (genus), a genus of fish
 Tenualosa ilisha, a species of fish known by the common name ilisha